The Gauler Twin Houses are two specular Prairie style houses located at 5917 and 5921 North Magnolia Avenue in Chicago, Illinois, United States. The houses were built in 1908 by Walter Burley Griffin for John Gauler, a land speculator. They were added to the National Register of Historic Places on June 17, 1977 and designated a Chicago Landmark on June 28, 2000.

References

Houses completed in 1908
Houses on the National Register of Historic Places in Chicago
Chicago Landmarks
Walter Burley Griffin buildings
1908 establishments in Illinois